Siegmund Walter "Sigi" Nissel  (3 January 1922 – 21 May 2008) was an Austrian-born British violinist who played second violin in the Amadeus Quartet and served as its administrator.

Sigi Nissel was born in Munich to a Jewish family from Vienna. He began playing the violin at the age of 6. His mother died when he was 9. He was taken by his father to Vienna, where his teachers included Max Weissgärber. Nissel was evacuated from Vienna in 1938 to Great Britain.

During World War II, Nissel was interned as a "friendly enemy alien" in Onchan Camp on the Isle of Man where he met the violist Peter Schidlof and later the violinist Norbert Brainin. With the British cellist, Martin Lovett, they would form the Amadeus Quartet.

The Amadeus Quartet, informally known as the Wolf Gang, gave its first concert in London in 1948. The Amadeus Quartet made some 200 recordings, among them the complete quartets of Beethoven, Brahms, and Mozart and works by 20th-century composers such as Béla Bartók and Benjamin Britten (who wrote his third quartet for them).

Nissel played the "Payne" Stradivarius of 1731.

He married the statistician Muriel Griffiths in 1957, and they had a daughter Claire and a son Daniel.

Following the death of Schidlof from a heart attack in 1987, the Amadeus Quartet disbanded. Nissel became a teacher of young quartets at the Royal Academy of Music, and died in London.

Further reading 
 Muriel Nissel, Married to the Amadeus: Life with a String Quartet, Giles de la Mare Publishers Limited, 1998 (a memoir by Nissel's wife of her "marriage" to the Amadeus)

References

External links 
 Siegmund Nissel: Second violin and administrator for the Amadeus Quartet, obituary in The Telegraph, 23 May 2008
 Siegmund Nissel, 86, of Amadeus Group, Is Dead, obituary in The New York Times, 24 May 2008

Jewish classical musicians
Austrian classical violinists
British classical violinists
British male violinists
Jewish emigrants from Austria to the United Kingdom after the Anschluss
German emigrants to Austria
1922 births
2008 deaths
People interned in the Isle of Man during World War II
Musicians from Munich
Musicians from Vienna
German people of Austrian-Jewish descent
German people of Russian-Jewish descent
20th-century classical violinists
Naturalised citizens of the United Kingdom
Officers of the Order of the British Empire
20th-century British male musicians
Male classical violinists